Trutnov District (German: Bezirk Trautenau) is a district (okres) within Hradec Králové Region of the Czech Republic. Its administrative center is the town of Trutnov.

Complete list of municipalities
Batňovice - 
Bernartice - 
Bílá Třemešná - 
Bílé Poličany - 
Borovnice - 
Borovnička - 
Čermná - 
Černý Důl - 
Chotěvice - 
Choustníkovo Hradiště - 
Chvaleč - 
Dolní Branná - 
Dolní Brusnice - 
Dolní Dvůr - 
Dolní Kalná - 
Dolní Lánov - 
Dolní Olešnice - 
Doubravice - 
Dubenec - 
Dvůr Králové nad Labem - 
Hajnice -
Havlovice - 
Horní Brusnice - 
Horní Kalná - 
Horní Maršov - 
Horní Olešnice - 
Hostinné -
Hřibojedy - 
Janské Lázně - 
Jívka - 
Klášterská Lhota - 
Kocbeře - 
Kohoutov - 
Královec - 
Kuks - 
Kunčice nad Labem - 
Lampertice - 
Lánov - 
Lanžov - 
Libňatov - 
Libotov - 
Litíč - 
Malá Úpa - 
Malé Svatoňovice - 
Maršov u Úpice -
Mladé Buky - 
Mostek - 
Nemojov - 
Pec pod Sněžkou - 
Pilníkov - 
Prosečné - 
Radvanice - 
Rtyně v Podkrkonoší - 
Rudník - 
Špindlerův Mlýn - 
Stanovice - 
Staré Buky - 
Strážné - 
Suchovršice - 
Svoboda nad Úpou - 
Třebihošť - 
Trotina - 
Trutnov - 
Úpice - 
Velké Svatoňovice - 
Velký Vřešťov - 
Vilantice - 
Vítězná - 
Vlčice - 
Vlčkovice v Podkrkonoší - 
Vrchlabí - 
Zábřezí-Řečice - 
Žacléř -
Zdobín - 
Zlatá Olešnice

References

External links
 List of towns and villages of the Trutnov District

 
Districts of the Czech Republic